F420 may refer to :
 Coenzyme F420, a coenzyme involved in redox reactions in methanogens
 HMNZS Tutira (F420), a 1948 Loch class frigate of the Royal New Zealand Navy